Park Eun-bin (born September 4, 1992) is a South Korean actress. A former child actress, she is known for her lead roles in the television series Hello, My Twenties! (2016–2017), Hot Stove League (2019–2020), Do You Like Brahms? (2020), The King's Affection (2021), and Extraordinary Attorney Woo (2022).

Park was named 2022 Gallup Korea's Television Actor of the Year, Sisa Journal's Cultural Person of the Year  and Cultura's Drama Icon of 2022.

Career

1996–2017: Debut as a child actress and transition to leading roles
Park Eun-bin debuted at the age of five and has starred in numerous television series as a child actress, playing the younger version of various characters. She received the Best Young Actress award in 2007 for her role in the drama Catching Up with Gangnam Moms.

She landed her first leading role in the time-traveling romance Operation Proposal (2012).
After Operation Proposal, Park continued playing supporting roles until she gained recognition for her role in the youth ensemble cast series about a group of young women in their early 20s, Hello, My Twenties! in 2016 and its sequel in 2017.
In 2017, she was cast in the legal drama Judge vs. Judge, followed by horror thriller The Ghost Detective in 2018.

2019–present: Career rise and breakthrough
Park then starred in the hit sports drama Hot Stove League (2019–2020) alongside Namkoong Min, in which she played the operations manager of a floundering baseball team. The series, which premiered to a 3% viewership rating, went on to achieve a peak rating of 19.1%. and won Best Drama at the 56th Baeksang Arts Awards.
After Hot Stove League, Park was cast as an aspiring violinist in the musical romance drama Do You Like Brahms?. Despite having some experience playing the violin, Park spent 3 months practising the instrument to prepare for the role. Her performance garnered her the Top Excellence Actress Award at the 2020 SBS Drama Awards.

In 2021, Park played the role of Crown Prince Yi Hwi in the historical series The King's Affection. For her portrayal of the cross-dressing heroine, Park received the Top Excellence Actress Award at the 2021 KBS Drama Awards and a Best Actress nomination at the 58th Baeksang Arts Awards. Park also received the Best Actor Award at the 49th Korean Broadcasting Awards for her role. The drama was also awarded Best Telenovela at the 50th International Emmy Awards.

In 2022, Park starred in Park Hoon-jung's action-horror film The Witch: Part 2. The Other One, the sequel to the 2018 film The Witch: Part 1. The Subversion. In the same year, she starred in Extraordinary Attorney Woo, playing the titular role of Woo Young-woo, a lawyer who is an autistic savant. It was later revealed that the production team waited over a year for Park to take part in the drama. This performance earned her acclaim from both critics and audiences.  Through her portrayal, the drama, which aired on the new channel ENA, started with an audience rating of 0.9% and finished with 17.5%, sparking syndrome-like popularity in Korea. The drama was a global success, ranking in the top 10 most watched non-English TV series on Netflix for 21 weeks. Park's compelling performance earned her international recognition, winning the Best Actor Award at the Asia Contents Awards  and the Rising Star Award for TV at the Critics Choice Awards Asian Pacific Cinema & Television.

On September 3, 2022, Park held her first solo fan meeting since her debut as an actor. Later, Park announced her first Asian fan meeting tour that commenced in Manila on October 23, continued in Bangkok, Singapore, and Tokyo in November and Malaysia in December.

In March 2023, Park announced that he would be hosting Park Eun-bin's first official fan party 'Bingo', hereinafter called Eunbin Note: High Bingo No. 1', to be held on April 9.

Filmography

Film

Television series

Web series

Television shows

Music video

Hosting

Theater

Discography

Singles

Awards and nominations

Listicles

Notes

References

External links

Park Eun-bin at Namoo Actors 

1992 births
Living people
South Korean child actresses
21st-century South Korean actresses
South Korean television actresses
South Korean film actresses
South Korean stage actresses
South Korean web series actresses
Actresses from Seoul
Sogang University alumni